The 2014–2015 season was AFC Wimbledon's thirteenth season since formation in 2002 and the club's fourth consecutive season in Football League Two.

League table

Results summary

Match results

Pre-season friendlies

League Two 2014–15

August

September

October

November

December

January

February

March

April

May

FA Cup 2014–15

Football League Cup 2014–15

Football League Trophy 2014–15

Player statistics

Appearances and goals

|-
|colspan="14"|Players who featured on loan for AFC Wimbledon but subsequently returned to their parent club:

|-
|colspan="14"|Players who left or were released by AFC Wimbledon during the course of the season:

|}

Top scorers

*Including own goals by opposition.

Disciplinary record

Transfers

References

AFC Wimbledon seasons
AFC Wimbledon